Sympistis badistriga, the brown-lined sallow, is a species of moth in the family Noctuidae (the owlet moths).

The MONA or Hodges number for Sympistis badistriga is 10059.

References

Further reading

 
 
 

badistriga
Articles created by Qbugbot
Moths described in 1872